Staniszkis is a Polish surname, a Polish rendering of the Lithuanian surname Staniškis.

Jadwiga Staniszkis (born 1942), Polish sociologist and political scientist
Maria Staniszkis (1911–2004), Polish lawyer
 (1880–1941), Polish professor of agriculture, politician and statesman

Polish-language surnames